TM or Tm and variants may refer to:
 Trademark, often indicated with the symbol ™
 Trademark symbol

Businesses and organizations
 TM Forum, telecommunications and entertainment industry association
 TM Supermarket, a chain of supermarkets in Zimbabwe
 LAM Mozambique Airlines (IATA airline designator TM)
 Telekom Malaysia, telecommunications company (2482TM)
 Texas Mexican Railway (reporting mark TM)
 TM (cellular service), a telecommunications brand in the Philippines
 Toastmasters International, an international public speaking organization
 Toyota Motor Corporation (NYSE symbol TM)
 Tokyo Metro, one of the major subway systems of Tokyo

Science and technology

Biology and medicine
 Melting temperature (Tm) in nucleic acid thermodynamics, at which half of DNA strands are in the ssDNA state
 Transport maximum, where concentration increase does not speed membrane traversal
 Transverse myelitis, a neurological condition in which the spinal cord is inflamed
 Translational medicine

Computing
 .tm, the Internet domain code for Turkmenistan
 Struct tm, calendar time type in the C and C++ programming languages
 Traceability matrix, in software development
 Translation memory
 Turing machine, a hypothetical universal computing machine

Physics and chemistry
 Tm ligands, a tridentate ligand used in coordination chemistry
 Melting point (abbreviated Tm), in physics and materials science
 Thulium, symbol Tm, a chemical element
 Transition metal
 Transverse Magnetic modes, in optics and wave theory

Weapons
 TM 65 mine, a Finnish anti-tank mine
 TM series of Soviet and Russian anti-tank mines
 TM-41 mine, a Soviet World War II mine
 TM-46 mine, a Soviet post-war mine
 TM-57 mine, a Soviet Cold War mine
 TM-62 series of mines, a series of Soviet Cold War blast mines
 TM-83 mine, a 1990s Russian mine
 TM-89 mine, a 1990s Russian mine

Other uses in science and technology
 Thematic Mapper, an Earth-observing sensor on a Landsat satellite
 Terametre (Tm), equal to 1012 metres
 TM (triode) (from French ), standard small-signal vacuum tube of the Allies of World War I

People
Theresa May is sometimes referred to as TM

Other uses
 Thames Measurement, a shipping tonnage measure
 Their Majesties, for multiple monarchs each styled "His/Her Majesty"
 Torpedoman's mate, a former rank of the U.S. Navy
 Transcendental Meditation, a specific form of mantra meditation
 Trans-Manhattan Expressway, a highway in New York City
 Turkmenistan (ISO country code TM)
 TrackMania, a Nadeo game
 TM (album), an album by Brockhampton